Liladhar Joshi  was an Indian politician. He was elected to the Lok Sabha, the lower house of the Parliament of India  as a member of the Indian National Congress. He was the First Chief Minister of Madhya Bharat.

References

External links
Official biographical sketch in Parliament of India website

Indian National Congress politicians
Lok Sabha members from Madhya Pradesh
1907 births
Year of death missing
People from Shajapur
India MPs 1957–1962
Indian National Congress politicians from Madhya Pradesh